Kuh Gari-ye Kheyrabad (also Romanized as Kūh Garī-ye Kheyrābād; also known as Kūh-e Garī and Kūh Garī) is a village in Kheyrabad Rural District, in the Central District of Kharameh County, Fars Province, Iran. At the 2006 census, its population was 229, in 60 families.

References 

Populated places in Kharameh County